In Aztec mythology, Cihuacōātl  ("snake woman"; also Cihuacóatl) was one of a number of motherhood and fertility goddesses. Cihuacōātl was sometimes known as Quilaztli.

Cihuacōātl was especially associated with midwives, and with the sweatbaths where midwives practiced. She is paired with Quilaztli and was considered a protectress of the Chalmeca people and patroness of the city of Culhuacan. She helped Quetzalcoatl create the current race of humanity by grinding up bones from the previous ages, and mixing it with his blood.  She is also the mother of Mixcoatl, whom she abandoned at a crossroads. Tradition says that she often returns there to weep for her lost son, only to find a sacrificial knife. 

Cihuacōātl held political symbolism as she represented victory for the Mexica state and the ruling class.

Although she was sometimes depicted as a young woman, similar to Xōchiquetzal, she is more often shown as a fierce skull-faced old woman carrying the spears and shield of a warrior. Childbirth was sometimes compared to warfare and the women who died in childbirth were honored as fallen warriors. Their spirits, the Cihuateteo, were depicted with skeletal faces like Cihuacōātl. Like her, the Cihuateteo were thought to haunt crossroads at night to steal children.

Functionary of Tenochtitlan
The name cihuacoatl was used as a title for one of the low functionaries of [Tenochtitlan], the Aztec capital. The cihuacoatl supervised the internal affairs of the land as opposed to the Aztec ruler, who oversaw the affairs of the Aztec state. The cihuacoatl commanded the army of Tenochtitlan to the emperor. During the course of the 15th century AD Tlacaelel served as cihuacoatl under four emperors - Moctezuma I, Axayacatl, Tizoc and Ahuizotl.

See also
La Llorona (a similar modern myth)

Notes

Citations

References

Further reading
 Klein, Cecelia. Rethinking Cihuacoatl: Political Imagery of the Conquered Woman. Oxford, 1988.
Nicholson, Henry B. “Religion in Pre-Hispanic Central Mexico.” In Handbook of Middle American Indians, edited by Gordon Ekholm and Ignacio Bernal, vol. 10, pp. 395–445. Austin, Tex., 1971.
Sahagún, Bernardino de, 1950–1982, Florentine Codex: History of the Things of New Spain, translated and edited by Arthur J.O. Anderson and Charles Dibble, Monographs of the school of American research, no 14. 13. parts Salt Lake City: University of Utah Press
 The History of the Indies of New Spain by Diego Durán, translated, annoted and with introduction by Doris Heyden
 The Book of the Gods and Rites, by Diego Duran, translated and edited by Fernando Horcasitas and Doris Heyden, Chapter XIII

Aztec goddesses
Death goddesses
Fertility goddesses
Mother goddesses
Childhood goddesses